The Airbus Helicopters H215 (formerly Eurocopter AS332 Super Puma) is a four-bladed, twin-engine, medium-size utility helicopter developed and initially produced by the French aerospace company Aérospatiale. It has been subsequently manufactured by the successor companies Eurocopter and Airbus Helicopters. The Super Puma is a re-engined and more voluminous version of the original Aérospatiale SA 330 Puma.

Development of the Super Puma was carried out during the 1970s, based on the successful SA 330 Puma. While retaining a similar layout, the fuselage was redesigned to increase its damage tolerance and crashworthiness, while composite materials were also more extensively used. Furthermore, a pair of more powerful Turbomeca Makila turboshaft engines were also adopted along with a more streamlined nose, amongst other changes. Two distinct fuselage lengths, a shortened and stretched form, were developed from the onset. On 5 September 1977, the SA 331 pre-production prototype performed its maiden flight; the first true Super Puma made its first flight roughly one year later. By 1980, the Super Puma had succeeded the SA 330 Puma as Aérospatiale's principal utility helicopter.

The Super Puma quickly proved itself to be a commercial success amongst both military and civil customers. The French Army were a keen early customer, using the type in its new rapid response task force, the Force d'Action Rapide, and routinely dispatching Super Pumas to support France's overseas engagements in both Africa and the Middle East. Indonesia also became a prominent nation for the Super Puma, with the state-owned aircraft manufacturer PT Dirgantara Indonesia (PT DI) securing a license to produce it locally. In the civilian sector, it has been heavily used to support offshore oil rigs and aerial firefighting operations. Since 1990, Super Pumas in military service have been marketed under the AS532 Cougar designation. In civilian service, a next generation successor to the AS 332 was introduced in 2004, the further-enlarged Eurocopter EC225 Super Puma.

Development

Origins

During 1974, Aérospatiale commenced development of a new medium transport helicopter based on its successful SA 330 Puma. The project's existence was publicly announced at the 1975 Paris Air Show. While the new design retained a similar general layout to the preceding AS 330, it was powered by a pair of Turbomeca Makila turboshaft engines, which had recently been developed and were more powerful than the preceding Turbomeca Turmo. The rotorcraft's four-bladed main rotor was redesigned to make use of composite materials. The design team paid substantial attention to increasing the new model's damage resistance; thus, a more robust fuselage structure was adopted along with a new crashworthy undercarriage, while the rotor blades are also able to withstand some battle damage, along with various other key mechanical systems across the rotorcraft.

External features than distinguish the new helicopter from the SA 330 include a ventral fin underneath the tail boom and a more streamlined nose. From the project's onset, it had been planned for the new rotorcraft to be available in two fuselage lengths, consisting of a short fuselage version that had similar capacity to the SA 330 while providing superior performance under "hot and high" conditions, and a stretched version which allowed for greater quantities of internal cargo or passengers to be carried in circumstances where overall weight was deemed to be less critical.

On 5 September 1977, a pre-production prototype, the SA 331, modified from a SA 330 airframe via the addition of Makila engines and a new gearbox, performed its maiden flight. The first prototype of the full Super Puma made its first flight on 13 September 1978, and was quickly followed by a further five prototypes. Flight testing revealed that, in comparison with the SA 330 Puma, the AS 332 Super Puma possessed a higher cruise speed and more range, in part due to the Makila engine providing a greater power output along with a 17% reduction in fuel consumption per mile. The Super Puma also demonstrated its far superior flight stabilisation tendencies and was less reliant on automated corrective systems. The development of both military and civil variants was carried out in parallel, including at the certification stage. During 1981, the first civil Super Puma was delivered.

Production and improvements
By 1980, the AS 332 Super Puma had replaced the preceding SA 330 Puma as Aérospatiale's principal utility helicopter. It quickly proved to be highly popular amongst its customers; between July 1981 and April 1987, there was an average production rate of three helicopters per month being built for operators from both the military and civil sectors. The success of the AS 332 Super Puma led to the pursuit of additional development programs that produced further advanced models. These saw the arrival of features such as lengthened rotor blades, more powerful engines and gearboxes, increases in takeoff weight, and modernised avionics. Furthermore, overseas manufacturing was also established; Indonesian Aerospace (IPTN) has produced both the SA 330 and AS 332 under license from Aerospatiale; IPTN-build rotorcraft were produced for both domestic and some overseas customers.

A wide variety of specialised Super Puma variants followed the basic utility transport model into operation, including dedicated Search and rescue (SAR) and Anti-submarine warfare (ASW) versions. Since 1990, military-orientated Super Pumas have been marketed under the AS532 Cougar name. As a fallback option to the NHIndustries NH90 programme, a Mark III Super Puma was also considered for development at one stage. By 2005, various models of Super Puma had been operated by numerous customers across 38 nations for a wide variety of purposes. In total, 565 Super Pumas (including military-orientated Cougars) had been delivered or were on order at this point as well.

During February 2012, Eurocopter announced that it was offering a lower cost basic Super Puma configuration that would be more competitive with rivals such as the Russian-built Mil Mi-17. Starlite Aviation became the launch customer for this new variant, designated AS 332 C1e. In November 2015, Airbus Helicopters announced that manufacturing activity of the AS 332 Super Puma, which was redesignated as the H215 at that point, would be transferred to a new purpose-built final assembly facility in Brasov, Romania. This move is aimed to cut production time and cost by simplifying production  to a single baseline configuration that shall then be customised to meet the needs of both civil and military customers.

Design

The Eurocopter AS332 Super Puma is a medium-size utility helicopter. It is powered by a pair of Turbomeca Makila 1A1 turboshaft engines which drive the rotorcraft's four-bladed main rotor and five-bladed tail rotor along with a pair of independent hydraulic systems and a pair of electrical alternators. Fuel is housed across six internal fuel tanks, while additional auxiliary and external tanks can be equipped for extended flight endurance. For safety, the fuel tanks use a crashworthy plumbing design and fire detection and suppression systems are installed in the engine bay. The monocoque tail boom is fitted with tail rotor strike protection, the forward portion of the boom also accommodates a luggage compartment. The retractable tricycle landing gear has been designed to provide high energy absorption qualities.

The main cabin of the Super Puma, which is accessed via a pair of sliding plug doors, features a reconfigurable floor arrangement that enables various passenger seating or cargo configurations to be adopted, which includes specialised configurations for medical operators. According to Airbus Helicopters, in addition to the two pilots, the short-fuselage AS332 can accommodate up to 15 passengers while the stretched-fuselage AS332 increases this to 20 passengers in a comfortable configuration. Soundproof upholstery is installed, as is separately-adjustable heating and ventilation systems. In addition to the doors, 12 windows line the sides of main cabin area, these are jettisonable to become emergency exits if required. The lower fuselage can also be fitted with flotation gear to give the rotorcraft additional buoyancy. A hatch is set into the cabin floor which facilitates access to the cargo sling pole, in addition to individual stowage space for airborne equipment.

The flight control system of the Super Puma uses a total of four dual-body servo units for pitch control of the cyclic, collective, and tail rotor. A duplex digital autopilot is also incorporated. The cockpit is equipped with dual flight controls. Principle instrumentation consists of four multifunction liquid crystal displays along with two display and autopilot control panels; for redundancy, a single Integrated Standby Instrument System (ISIS) and Vehicle Monitoring System (VMS) are also fitted. According to Airbus Helicopters, the avionics installed upon later variants has ensured a high level of operational safety. Third party firms have offered various upgrades for the Super Puma, these have included integrated flight management systems, global positioning systems (GPS) receivers, a digital map display, flight data recorders, an anti-collision warning system, Night Vision Goggles-compatibility, and multiple radios.

A navalised variant of the Super Puma has also been manufactured for performing anti-submarine warfare and anti-surface warfare missions. In such a configuration, the Super Puma is modified with additional corrosion protection, a folding tail rotor boom, a deck-landing guidance system, sonar equipment, and the nose-mounted Omera search radar. For the anti-surface role, it can be armed with a pair of Exocet anti-ship missiles.

Operational history

In August 1983, the French government created a new rapid response task force, the Force d'Action Rapide, to support France's allies as well as to contribute to France's overseas engagements in Africa and the Middle East; up to 30 Super Pumas were assigned to the taskforce. In June 1994, France staged a military intervention in the ongoing Rwandan genocide, dispatching a military task force to neighboring Zaire; Super Pumas provided the bulk of the task force's rotary lift capability, transporting French troops and equipment during their advance into Rwanda.

During the 1980s, the French Army were interested in mounting an airborne battlefield surveillance radar upon the Super Puma. The first prototype Orchidée was assembled at Aérospatiale's Marignane factory and began testing in late 1988; the French Army intended to procure 20 aircraft to equip two squadrons. Orchidée was described as having a pulse-Doppler radar mounted on the fuselage's underside, being capable of 360-degree scanning to detect low flying helicopters and ground vehicles at ranges of up to 150 km; gathered data was to be relayed in real time to mobile ground stations via a single-channel data link for processing and analysis before being transmitted to battlefield commanders. The system was said to be capable of all-weather operation, and would feature protection against counteracting hostile electronic countermeasures. However, development was aborted in mid-1990 during post-Cold War defence spending reductions.

Indonesia has been a key customer for the Super Puma, the state-owned aircraft manufacturer PT Dirgantara Indonesia (PT DI) having secured a license to produce the type. While the company was initially involved in the assembly and finishing of Super Pumas delivered from Europe, PT DI has expanded the range of its manufacturing involvement in the type over time while also expanding its collaboration with Eurocopter. In 1989, the Indonesian Air Force (IAF) placed an order for 16 Super Pumas as a replacement for the aging Sikorsky S-58T fleet; however, amid continued funding shortfalls, only seven units had been delivered by 2008, the operations of which were reportedly hampered by a lack of spare parts. The Indonesian Government had also ordered 16 Super Pumas for purposes such as VIP transport, seven of which had been delivered by 2008. Production of these rotorcraft has been performed locally by PT DI.

A key export customer was Switzerland, having originally purchased 15 AS 332M1 Super Pumas, locally designated TH89, for the Swiss Air Force. These were subsequently joined by 11 AS 532UL Cougars, designated TH98, while the TH06 programme was launched in 2006 to the retrofit the earlier Super Puma fleet with new avionics that either equalled or exceeded the capabilities of the newer Cougar fleet by RUAG. The Swiss Air Force has typically deployed the type for Intelligence, Surveillance and Reconnaissance (ISR) and Search and Rescue (SAR) missions. Swiss Super Pumas have occasionally been deployed outside the country, usually to provide humanitarian aid, such as a deployment to Greece where they engaged in aerial firefighting during August 2021.

During 1988, Sweden arranged to procure a fleet of 12 Super Pumas; they were primarily operated domestically, although they were deployed overseas occasionally, such as to provide medical evacuation services to coalition forces engaged in the War in Afghanistan. In October 2015, the Swedish Air Force retired its last Super Puma, replacing it with newer rotorcraft such as the NHIndustries NH90 and Sikorsky UH-60M Black Hawk. Six of these retired Super Pumas were sold on and refurbished for further service with other operators.

During 1990, Nigeria made a deal with Aerospatiale to exchange several of their Pumas for larger Super Pumas. In November 2009, an additional five used Super Pumas were acquired from France for peacekeeping and surveillance operations in the Niger Delta. In 2015, it was reported that a number of weaponised Super Pumas had been procured by the Nigerian Air Force for anti-insurgency operations against Boko Haram. During 2000, a pair of Nigerian Super Pumas were deployed to in Cross River State to improve area surveillance and increase available firepower in response to insecurity in the vicinity of the Bakassi axis.

In late 1990s, the Hellenic Air Force (HAF) issued a request for acquiring more modern and capable SAR helicopters, in order to replace its ageing fleet of Agusta Bell AB-205 SAR helicopters, which were in use since 1975. The need for an all-weather, day and night, long range SAR helicopter for operations throughout the Athens FIR came up after the Imia/Kardak incident of 1996, and the growing tension between Greece and Turkey over territorial water disputes on the Aegean Sea. The Greek government signed a deal with Eurocopter for the purchase of an initial four AS-332 C1 Super Pumas in 1998. HAF acquired two more Super Pumas for air support operations of the Athens 2004 Olympic Games and six more helicopters followed up in the period 2007–2011 for the new CSAR role of the 384 SAR/CSAR Sq. All HAF Super Pumas are of the C1 version, which includes features such as a four-axis auto pilot, a NADIR type1000 navigation and mission management computer, FLIR turrets, an RBR1500B search radar, an engine anti-icing system, a hydraulic and an electrical hoist, a SPECTROLAB SX-16 searchlight, engine exhaust gas deflectors, a Bertin loudspeaker, and six stretcher interior configuration for MEDEVAC missions.

The Spanish Air Force operated Super Pumas for various purposes. The fleet participated in the War in Afghanistan between 2005 and 2011, at one point being the sole rotorcraft providing combat search and rescue (CSAR) and MEDEVAC cover in Afghanistan's western regions, the last of these were withdrawn in November 2013. The type has also participated in fire fighting operations domestically. During the 2010s, Spain decided to replace its Super Puma with the newer NH90, delivery of the Spanish Air Force's first example took place in 2020.

VH-34 is the Brazilian Air Force's designation for the helicopter used to transport the President of Brazil. A pair of modified Super Pumas were used as the main presidential helicopters, having been configured to carry up to fifteen passengers and three crew members. The VH-34 model was progressively supplemented and later replaced by the VH-36, the later EC725. Various French presidents, such as François Mitterrand, have used military Super Pumas as an official transport during diplomatic missions. During 2008, British Prime Minister Gordon Brown was flown in a Super Puma during a tour of Iraq.

The Super Puma has reportedly proven to be well-suited to off-shore operations for the North Sea oil industry, where the type has been used to ferry personnel and equipment to and from oil platforms. One of the biggest civil operators of the Super Puma is Bristow Helicopters, who had a fleet of at least 30 Super Pumas in 2005; CHC Helicopters is another large civil operator, having possessed a fleet of 56 Super Pumas in 2014. During the 1990s, Iran procured at least seven Indonesian-built Super Pumas for civil offshore oil exploration missions. Super Pumas are also operated by Petrobras, the largest energy company in Brazil, to support its long distance oil rigs. The largest civil helicopter operator in China, CITIC Offshore Helicopter, operates a sizable Super Puma fleet. At least 19 Super Pumas have been operated by Germany's Federal Police service as of 2018.

The Finnish Border Guard has operated numerous AS332 L1 Super Pumas equipped for maritime reconnaissance and search and rescue operations throughout the country. To better suit the challenging prevailing conditions, they are typically fitted with forward-looking infrared (FLIR), a four-axis autopilot, and deicing apparatus. During the late 2010s, older members of Finland's Super Puma fleet were transported to Romania to be modernised and equipped to the newer H215 standard.

In 2014, Airbus Helicopters, the manufacturer of the type, declared that the Super Puma/Cougar family had accumulated a total of 890 delivered rotorcraft to customers across 56 nations. By 2015, 187 Super Pumas had been reportedly ordered by military customers; amongst others, the orders included 29 for Argentina, 30 for Spain, 33 for Indonesia, 22 for Singapore and 12 for Greece.

In November 2017, Romania announced its intention to buy up to 16 rotorcraft and planned to make a 30% down-payment towards the first four aircraft later that same year.

Variants

 SA 331 – Initial prototype, based on SA 330 airframe, first flew on 5 September 1977.
 AS 332A – Commercial pre-production version.
 AS 332B – Military version.
 AS 332B1 – First military version.
 AS 332C – Production civil version.
 AS 332C1 – Search and rescue version, equipped with a search radar and six stretchers.
 AS 332F – Military anti-submarine and anti-ship version.
 AS 332F1 – Naval version.
 AS 332L – Civil version with more powerful engines, a lengthened fuselage, a larger cabin space and a larger fuel tank.
 AS 332L1 – Stretched civil version, with a long fuselage and an airline interior.
 AS 332L2 Super Puma Mk 2 – Civil transport version, fitted with Spheriflex rotor head and EFIS.
 AS 332M – Military version of the AS 332L.
 AS 332M1 – Stretched military version.
 NAS 332 – Licensed version built by IPTN, now Indonesian Aerospace (PT. Dirgantara Indonesia).
 VH-34 – Brazilian Air Force designation for the two VIP configured Super Pumas

Operators

Civilian

 
State Emergency Service of Ukraine

 Azerbaijan Airlines

 Petrobras

 CITIC Offshore Helicopter

 CHC Helicopter

 German Federal Police

 Hellenic Fire Service - Operates two AS332L.1s.

 Government Flying Service

Icelandic Coast Guard

 Coast Guard
 Tokyo Fire Department

 Lufttransport

 Serbian Police (3 on order)

 Bond Offshore Helicopters
 Bristow Helicopters
 CHC Scotia

 Los Angeles County Sheriff's Department

 Southern Vietnam Helicopter Company

Military

 Albanian air force
 
National Guard of Ukraine

Argentine Army Aviation

Bolivian Air Force

Brazilian Air Force
Brazilian Naval Aviation

Chilean Navy

Ecuadorian Army

 Finnish Border Guard

French Air and Space Force

Gabonese Air Force

 Ministry of Defense

Hellenic Air Force

Indonesian Air Force
Indonesian Navy 

Royal Jordanian Air Force

Kuwait Air Force

 Royal Moroccan Gendarmerie

Mali Air Force

Nigerian Air Force

Royal Air Force of Oman

Royal Saudi Navy

Republic of Singapore Air Force

 Republic of Korea Air Force

Spanish Air and Space Force 

Swiss Air Force

Venezuelan Air Force

Uzbekistan Air Force

Former operators

Cameroon Air Force

People's Liberation Army Ground Force

Congolese Democratic Air Force

Japan Ground Self-Defense Force

Swedish Air Force

Royal Thai Air Force

Togolese Air Force

Notable accidents and incidents
 16 July 1988 – an AS332 L operated by Helikopter Service AS ditched in the North Sea due to heavy vibrations caused by the loss of a metal strip from one of the main rotor blades. All passengers and crew survived.
 14 March 1992 – G-TIGH lost control and crashed into the North Sea near East Shetland Basin. 11 of the 17 passengers and crew died.
 19 January 1995 – G-TIGK operated by Bristow Helicopters ditched in the North Sea. There were no fatalities; the aircraft, however, was lost.
 18 January 1996 – LN-OBP, an AS332 L1 operated by Helikopter Service AS, ditched in the North Sea some 200 kilometers south-west of Egersund. All passengers and crew survived and the helicopter was still floating 3 days later.
 18 March 1996 – LN-OMC, an AS332 operated by Airlift from Svalbard Airport crashed at Wijdefjorden. There were no fatalities
 8 September 1997 – LN-OPG, an AS332 L1 operated by Helikopter Service AS, suffered a catastrophic main gearbox failure and crashed en route from Brønnøysund to the Norne oil field, killing all 12 aboard. Eurocopter accepted some but not all of the AAIB/N recommendations.
11 August 2000 - Kaskasapakte, Sweden. A Swedish Air Force AS332M1 (10404 / H94) crash into the mountainside during initial approach to perform hoisting operations during a mountain rescue mission. All 3 crewmembers are killed. The cause of the accident was not fully determined, but difficult visual conditions is believed to have caused the crew to lose judgement of distance to the mountain side.
 18 November 2003 - Rörö, Sweden. A Swedish Air Force AS332M1 (10409 / H99) crash into the sea during a night-time hoist exercise near Rörö in Gothenburg’s archipelago. The task was to conduct a number of hoist cycles to the rescue ship "Märta Collin". On approach the aircraft suddenly hit the water at high velocity, killing six crew members. Only one crew member, a conscript rescue swimmer, survived with minor injuries. The cause of the accident was not fully determined, but was believed to have been the result of incorrect flight attitude awareness in bad weather. 
 21 November 2006 – A Eurocopter AS332 L2 search and rescue helicopter ditched in the North Sea. The aircraft was equipped with two automatic inflatable life rafts, but both failed to inflate. The Dutch Safety Board afterwards issued a warning.
The AAIB's initial report found that the crash was caused by a "catastrophic failure" in the aircraft's main rotor gearbox epicyclic module.
 11 November 2011 – XC-UHP AS332-L Super Puma of Mexico's General Coordination of the Presidential Air Transport Unit crashed in the Amecameca region south of Mexico City. Mexico's Secretary of the Interior Francisco Blake Mora died in this accident along with seven other crew and passengers.
 21 March 2013 – During a readiness exercise, a German Federal Police (Bundespolizei) Eurocopter EC155 collided with a Super Puma on the ground while landing in whiteout conditions in the Olympic Stadium in Berlin, Germany, destroying both aircraft, killing one of the pilots and injuring numerous bystanders. The whiteout was caused by snow on the ground being stirred up by the helicopter downdraft.
 23 August 2013 – A Super Puma L2 helicopter G-WNSB experienced a (so far unexplained) loss of air speed on a low approach and ditched into the North Sea two miles west of Sumburgh Airport at about 18:20 BST. The aircraft experienced a hard impact and overturned shortly after hitting the water. However, its armed flotation system deployed and the aircraft stayed afloat. Four passengers were killed, while both crew and a further 12 passengers were rescued, most with injuries. To date, the AAIB stated it was not caused by mechanical failure. A court has ordered the CV/FDR be released to the UK CAA for analysis on behalf of the Crown Office.
 28 September 2016 - Saint Gothard Pass region, Switzerland, A Swiss Air Force Super Puma struck a landline 50m after taking off, both pilots were killed and the loadmaster sustained undisclosed injuries but survived. The helicopter was a total loss as it burned out completely. After a lengthy investigation the pilots were found to not have been at fault.

 18 January 2023 - a Ukrainian National Guard Super Puma crashed into a residential building in Brovary, Ukraine during a blackout combined with low visibility, killing all its 9 occupants, among which Ukraines Interior Minister Denys Monastyrsky, First Deputy Minister Yevhen Yenin and Secretary of State Yurii Lubkovych, and at least 9 people on the ground, all of whom children and staff of a local kindergarten.

Specifications (AS332 L1)

See also

References

Citations

Bibliography

 Charbonneau, Bruno. France and the New Imperialism: Security Policy in Sub-Saharan Africa. Ashgate Publishing, 2008. .
 Chipman, John. French Military Policy and African Security, Routledge, 1985. .
 Endres, Günter G. and Michael J. Gething. Jane's Aircraft Recognition Guide. HarperCollins UK, 2005. .
 Hoyle, Craig. "World Air Forces Directory". Flight International, Vol. 182, No. 5370, 11–17 December 2012. pp. 40–64. .
 Hunter, Shireen. Iran's Foreign Policy in the Post-soviet Era: Resisting the New International Order. ABC-CLIO, 2010. .
 Jackson, Paul. "Super Puma". Air International, January 1984, Vol. 26 No. 1. . pp. 7–12, 33–35.
 Lake, Jon. "Variant File: Super Puma and Cougar: AS 332, AS 532 and EC 725". International Air Power Journal, Volume 3, Winter 2001/2002. Norwalk, Ct, USA:AIRtime Publishing, 2002. , . pp. 80–93.
 Lambert, Mark. "Super Puma: Cat with More Muscle." Flight International, 11 August 1979. pp. 437–439.
 Lambert, Mark (editor). Janes's All The World's Aircraft 1993–94. Coulsdon, UK:Jane's Data Division, 1993. .
 McGowen, Stanley S. Helicopters: An Illustrated History Of Their Impact. ABC-CLIO, 2005. .
 Ripley, Tim. Conflict in the Balkans 1991–2000. Osprey Publishing, 2010. .
 Scharenborg, Martin. "Fighting the fires". Air International, Vol. 103 No. 2, September 2022. pp. 68–72. .

External links 

 Airbus's official website for H215

Airbus Helicopters aircraft
1970s French civil utility aircraft
1970s French military utility aircraft
Aérospatiale aircraft
Search and rescue helicopters
Twin-turbine helicopters
Aircraft first flown in 1978